General elections were held in Antigua and Barbuda on 20 December 1951.  The election was the first in Antigua and Barbuda to be held under universal suffrage. Vere Bird formed the  Antigua Labour Party in 1951 and led the party to victory, winning all 8 seats on the legislative council. Voter turnout was 70.3%.

Results

References

Elections in Antigua and Barbuda
Antigua
1951 in Antigua and Barbuda
Landslide victories
December 1951 events in North America